Jan Robert Leegte (1973) is a Dutch artist who lives and works in Amsterdam. He is one of the first Dutch artists who makes art on and for the internet since the nineties. Nowadays, he makes art both on the internet, in the form of websites as in offline media, like prints, sculptures and projections. A recurring theme in his work is the sculptural materiality of interfaces and computer programs, like the graphic design of cursors, menu and scroll bars.

Biography 
Jan Robert Leegte first studied architecture at the Technical University of Delft, before he switched to the Willem de Kooning Academy in Rotterdam where he studied fine arts and interaction design.

Since 1997, Leegte makes art in the form of websites, that he connects to arthistorical movements like minimalism, land art and conceptualism. An example is the recreation of the iconic work 'Spiral Jetty' (1970) by the American artist Robert Smithson, that Leegte rebuilt in the platformgame Minecraft to explore the online possibilities of Land Art. Since 2002 he translates his online work to offline materials. In his sculptures and projections he gives a materiality to online phenomena, like scrollbars and selection boxes.

Leegte teaches at the Royal Academy of Fine Art in The Hague and Artez in Arnhem.

Exhibitions (selection) 
Recent exhibitions:

 'Van Gogh Inspires: Jan Robert Leegte', solo exhibition Van Goghmuseum (2021)
 'Sans objet', online tentoonstelling Centre Pompidou (2021)
 'Spatial Affairs', tentoonstelling Ludwig Museum (2021)

 'INSIDE | OUTSIDE', solotentoonstelling bij Upstream Gallery (2020)

 'Sculpting the Internet', solo exhibition at Upstream Gallery (2017)
 'On Digital Materiality', online solo exhibition at Carroll / Fletcher (2016)
 ‘Electronic Superhighway’, Whitechapel Gallery, London (2016)
 'Shifting Optics III', Upstream Gallery, Amsterdam (2016)
 'Gym of Obsolete Technology', W139, Amsterdam (2016)
 'Expeditie Land Art', Kunsthal KAdE, Amersfoort (2015)
 'Sublime Landscapes in Gaming', Rijksmuseum Twente, Enschede (2015)
 'Born Digital', Museum of the Image, Breda (2014)

External links 
 Website Jan Robert Leegte
 Website Upstream Gallery, who represent Jan Robert Leegte

Notes 

1973 births
Dutch male painters
Dutch male sculptors
Living people
21st-century Dutch people